Don Chezina (born Ricardo Garcia Ortiz in 1976) is a singer, producer, and talent scout of Rap, Reggae, and reggaeton music. He is known for his high, nasal voice and fast rapping along with his most famous song "Tra Tra Tra", which in 1998 became one of the first reggaeton songs to become popular in the United States. Chezina is considered one of the pioneers and was one of the biggest names in the early days of the reggaeton genre.

Discography
Bien Guillao de Gangster (1997)
Mi Trayectoria (1998)
Live From Miami (2003)
Éxitos (2004)
My Life (2007)
Original Don (2010)
Muchas ideas

References

American reggaeton musicians
Living people
1976 births
Rappers from Georgia (U.S. state)
21st-century American rappers